Rune Vikeby (born 24 August 1964) is a Norwegian sport shooter who has won the IPSC Norwegian Handgun Championship in practical shooting with revolver 5 times and  8 times. At the 2022 IPSC Handgun World Shoot he took gold i the Super Senior category in Production Optics Lite.

References 

IPSC shooters
Norwegian male sport shooters
Living people
1964 births